Mike Newell is the name of:

Mike Newell (director) (born 1942), film director
Mike Newell (basketball) (born 1951), American college basketball coach
Mike Newell (footballer) (born 1965), football manager and former player